Gosling's bunting (Emberiza goslingi), also known as the grey-throated bunting, is a species of bird in the family Emberizidae. It is found in Africa from Mauritania and Senegal to south-western Sudan and north-eastern Democratic Republic of Congo. Its natural habitats are dry savannah, subtropical or tropical dry shrubland, and subtropical or tropical dry lowland grassland.

It was previously considered conspecific with the cinnamon-breasted bunting.

References

Gosling's bunting
Birds of West Africa
Gosling's bunting